The Norwich Terrier is a breed of dog originating in the United Kingdom, and was bred to hunt small rodents. With a friendly personality, Norwich Terriers are today mostly a companion dog breed. One of the smallest terriers, these dogs are generally healthy, but are relatively rare, due in part to their low litter size and the common need for caesarian sections. Their drop-eared variety is the Norfolk Terrier.

Description

Appearance
These terriers are one of the smallest working terriers (at the withers), with prick ears and a double coat, which come in red, tan, wheaten, black and tan, and grizzle. Norwich Terriers can enjoy a tail length ranging from 2 inches to an impressive 8 inches. The consistency and frequency of tail wagging by the Norwich Terrier serves as an indicator of happiness.

Temperament

These small but hardy dogs are typically courageous, intelligent and affectionate.  They can be assertive, but it is unusual for them to be aggressive. They are energetic and thrive on an active life. They are known to be consistently hungry and will eat anything edible. They are eager to please, but have definite minds of their own.  They can be very sensitive to scolding. They should not be kept outside alone or in a kennel setting as they enjoy the companionship of their owners.  Norwich are not known to bark unnecessarily, but will warn if a stranger is approaching.  Once they realize that there is no threat, they become quite friendly.  Norwich are generally good with children, and if introduced to other household pets as a puppy they generally co-habit peacefully, though caution should be observed around rodent pets as they may be mistaken for prey.

Health

US and UK breed surveys put the life expectancy of the Norwich Terrier at 13–13.5 years. While the Norwich Terrier is considered a healthy breed, there are some health issues for which responsible breeders do preventive genetic health testing, thereby reducing the incidences.

The Norwich Terrier does have a predisposition for some health issues but studies to determine the exact mode of inheritance or the exact frequency in the breed are unknown or have not been conclusive.  At present there are no disorders identified as "most important".  Of secondary magnitude, cataracts are recognized as a disorder that has been reported sporadically and may be inherited.   Also of a secondary magnitude there are instances of epilepsy, narrow tracheas, luxating patellas, hip dysplasia, mitral valve disease, portosystemic shunts, atopy(allergic inhalant dermatitis) and incorrect bites (how the teeth meet when the jaws are closed).

Like all dogs, Norwich Terriers can have autoimmune reactivity to rabies vaccinations. Rabies-Vaccine-Induced Ischemic Dermatopathy, or RVI-ID, is a non-fatal but potentially serious reaction to chemicals called adjuvants in the vaccine.  RVI-ID is often misdiagnosed, but if correctly diagnosed, is treatable.  Symptoms may include: symmetrical dark spots or lesions at the tips of the ears; swelling, hard lumps or dark spots in the vicinity of the injection site.

Higher volume Norwich breeders are seeing more dogs with breathing concerns, and the Norwich and Norfolk Terrier Club (USA) has formed a new "Health and Genetics Sub-Committee for Research on Upper Airway Syndrome in Norwich Terriers".  Upper Airway Syndrome (UAS) covers all abnormalities that can occur in the upper airway, including:  elongated soft palates; too short soft palates; narrow/misshapen tracheas; collapsing tracheas; stenotic nares (nasal passages that are too small); swollen tonsils; everted laryngeal saccules.  These upper airway disorders can occur singly or in combination with one or two others.  All compromise the airway and the dog's ability to breathe normally; the dog's breathing often sounds raspy or moist.  It may be that shorter muzzles may have increased incidence of such issues.

Norwich Terriers generally have small litters of 1 to 3 puppies. Generally, if a female is healthy, its optimal breeding period is between the ages of 2 (after all genetic health testing is complete - heart, eyes, hips and patellas) and six years.  At seven years of age dogs are considered geriatric.  The small supply and the high price of a purebred Norwich Terrier - often around US$4,500 in 2020 - has attracted fraud, as unsuspecting buyers pay full price for Cairn Terriers with docked tails, or mixed-breed puppies.

In Canada and the United States, the Orthopedic Foundation for Animals maintains an open registry of dogs that have completed their genetic health testing program.

Care

Exercise requirements

Norwich Terriers are hardy, active dogs, bred for a working life of pursuing vermin and accompanying their farmer owners on horseback.  A good daily walk is therefore the minimum needed to meet the exercise requirements of a healthy Norwich Terrier.  Norwich Terriers compete in Earthdog competitions, and are increasingly common in Agility and Flyball competitions. The dogs were bred as working terriers, and thrive best with at least one hour of real activity daily, such as a good walk, run, or working session. Like any hard working dog, the Norwich Terrier loves to be rewarded with a hearty play session. Norwich Terriers show remarkable skills in fetching sticks, running long distances and even the occasional swim if supervised. Norwich Terriers are devoted to their owners and love companion sports.

Grooming
The Norwich Terrier has two coats - a harsh, wiry topcoat and a soft warm undercoat. Ideally, the coat is combed  with a steel comb daily to once a week to remove the loose, dead hairs and prevent matting. Proper maintenance of the Norwich coat, like other hard wiry coats, requires "stripping," or pulling the oldest hairs from the coat (using fingers and/or a "stripping knife," a special grooming comb). Stripping results both in the coat retaining its proper appearance, and in the health of the dog's skin and coat. Ideally, owners hand-strip the coat on a regular basis to achieve what is called a "rolling" coat, where hairs of all lengths are growing in.  Maintaining a rolling coat is easier on the dog's skin and requires shorter grooming sessions.  At minimum, the coat should be stripped once in the autumn and once in the spring. Clipping or cutting negatively affects the appearance of the coat's natural colours and texture.

Tail docking

Only the American Kennel Club calls for a medium docked tail (long enough for a man's hand to grasp), though a natural tail is not a disqualification. In Canada and most of Australia,
tail docking is optional, but in New South Wales, it is illegal. In the United Kingdom, tail docking is only permitted for working dogs and is banned for dogs bred as pets or showing. Other countries that have banned tail docking include: Norway in 1987, and Sweden in 1988. In the last four years Cyprus, Greece, Luxembourg and Switzerland have also decided to introduce a ban on tail docking.

Historically, tails were docked in the UK to avoid taxation of sporting dogs. Today, proponents of tail docking argue working Norwich Terriers should have a docked tail because there is less risk of damaging the tail or spine if it is used to extract the dog from a hole.  Some proponents suggest the docked tail makes for a prettier breed silhouette.  Opponents of tail docking contend that docking severely damages the important canine tail-signalling system, so vital to dogs' social communication.  Where form follows function, the tail assists the dog with balance for movement over rough terrain and turning at speed.  Arguments for and against tail docking are covered in this Michigan State University (Detroit College of Law) paper, including "History":

Breeding

Norwich Terriers are difficult to breed. Many have Caesarean sections. The North American average litter size for 2007 is two puppies with the total number of puppies for the year, in the USA, at approximately 750.
There are breeding lines with higher average litter sizes as can be easily traced in pedigrees of kennel clubs who include such information, e.g., The Dutch Kennel Club. Similar information can be obtained at the internet site of the Finnish Kennel Club. Recently in the United States, there has been significant pedigree fraud.  Sometimes these fake Norwich Terriers are sold over the internet.

History
The breed has existed since at least the late 19th century as a working terrier of East Anglia, England. The dogs were useful as ratters in the stable yard, bolters of fox for the hunt, and family companions. It was the mascot of Cambridge students. Small red terriers, descendants of Irish Terriers, had existed in the area since at least the 1860s, and these might be the ancestors of the Norwich, or it might have come from the Trumpington Terrier, a breed that no longer exists. In its earliest history, it was also known as the Jones Terrier and the Cantab Terrier.

Since its earliest identification as a breed, puppies have had either drop or prick ears, and both were allowed when the Norwich was first recognized in the show ring in 1932 by The Kennel Club (England). Drop ears were often cropped until it became illegal to do so. This intensified a long-standing controversy over whether drop-eared dogs should be allowed in the show ring and whether the primary difference was simply the ears or whether other, deeper, personality and structural differences marked the drop-eared variety. Starting in the 1930s, breeders increased their efforts to distinguish the breeds.  While Norfolk and Norwich Terriers were inter-bred for a number of years today they are positively two distinctive breeds.  In fact some historical texts indicate that they were distinctive breeds before they were inter-bred.

Both ear types continued to be allowed in the ring until The Kennel Club recognized the drop-eared variety as a separate breed, the Norfolk Terrier, in 1964, and the American Kennel Club, United Kennel Club, and Canadian Kennel Club did the same in 1979. Until that time, the breeds were designated by the AKC as Norwich Terriers, P.E. (prick ears) and Norwich Terriers, D.E. (drop ears).

See also
 Dogs portal
 List of dog breeds

References

Bibliography

External links

FCI breeds
Terriers
Dog breeds originating in England
Vulnerable Native Breeds